That's How a Heartache Begins is a 1964 compilation album consisting of songs recorded by American country music singer, Patsy Cline. The album was released by Decca Records on November 2, 1964.

Background
That's How a Heartache Begins contains songs Patsy Cline recorded under Decca and Four Star Records between 1959 and 1963. The album includes cover versions of "Bill Bailey Won't You Please Come Home" and Hank Williams' "Lovesick Blues". There is also other material by Hank Cochran and Harlan Howard
who wrote some of Cline's most famous hits, including "I Fall to Pieces," "Crazy," and "She's Got You". Unlike any other album before released by Decca, the record label did not reissue the album when the label changed from the Decca name to the MCA name in 1973. However, the album was issued in Australia and New Zealand in 1964 by Festival Records. The album spawned two singles, the title track and "He Called Me Baby," which peaked at #23 on the US Country Chart in 1964. The album as a whole did not chart among any album charts.

Track listing
Side 1

"Love Letters in the Sand" – 2:25 (J. Fred Coots, Charles F. Kenny, Nick A. Kenny)
"Bill Bailey, Won't You Please Come Home" – 2:43 (Hughie Cannon)
"Shoes" – 2:24 (Hank Cochran, Velma Smith)
"Lovesick Blues" – 2:25 (Cliff Friend, Irving Mills)
"Lovin' in Vain" – 2:24 (Freddie Hart)
"I'm Moving Along" – (Johnny Star)

Side 2

"That's How a Heartache Begins" – 2:22 (Harlan Howard)
"He Called Me Baby" – 2:20 (Howard)
"There He Goes" – 2:25 (Durwood Haddock, Eddie Miller, W.S. Stevenson)
"Crazy Dreams" – 2:30 (Charles Beam, Charles L. Jiles, Stevenson)
"I'm Blue Again" – 2:09 (Beam, Jiles, Stevenson)
"Love, Love, Love Me Honey Do" – 2:03 (Beam, Jiles, Stevenson)

Personnel
 Byron Bach – cello
 Brenton Banks – violin
 George Binkley III – violin
 Harold Bradley – electric bass
 Owen Bradley – producer
 Cecil Brower – viola
 Howard Carpenter – violin
 Patsy Cline – vocals
 Floyd Cramer – piano
 Ray Edenton – rhythm guitar
 Jimmy Day – steel guitar
 Solie Fott – violin 
 Hank Garland – electric guitar
 Buddy Harman – drums
 Randy Hughes – acoustic guitar
 Lillian Hunt – violin
 The Jordanaires – background vocals
 Mark Kathan – violin
 Ben Keith – steel guitar
 Doug Kirkham – drums
 Grady Martin – electric guitar, fiddle
 Bob Moore – acoustic bass
 Wayne Moss – electric bass
 Mildred Onk – violin
 Verne Richardson – violin
 Hargus "Pig" Robbins – piano
 Michael Semanitzky – violin
 Wilda Tinsley – violin
 Gary Williams – violin

Chart positions
Singles - Billboard (North America)

References

1964 albums
Patsy Cline albums
Albums produced by Owen Bradley
Albums published posthumously
Decca Records albums